Antri is a village in Madhya Pradesh, India, lying  south of Gwalior. Kirar thakur and brahmans and other caste kamariya, baghel, gurjar, kachi etc. Lives in antri. village is famous for clay deposits.
Current chairman Smt. Sunita sunil sharma (BJP)

Etymology
The name Antri is a colloquial variation of the Hindi word  ( which means "intestine".

History
Abu'l-Fazl ibn Mubarak was one of Mughal Emperor Akbar's courtiers. On 12 August 1602, he was assassinated at Narwar (near Antri) by Vir Singh Bundela. The plot to kill him was contrived by Akbar's oldest son Prince Salim, who later became the emperor Jahangir because Abu'l-Fazl opposed the accession of Prince Salim. His severed head was sent to Salim at Allahabad. Abu'l-Fazl was buried at Antri. Abu'l Fazl's son, Shaikh Afzal Khan (29 December 1571 – 1613), was later appointed governor of Bihar in 1608 by Jahangir, who had succeeded his father.

Antri is known for its role in the Indian Rebellion of 1857 against the British East India Company. After the British captured the town Kalpi (also called Jhansi) on 24 May 1858, rebels such as Rani sought shelter at a fort in Antri. The British soon attacked Antri and captured it. In the battle, Rani died against the militarily superior British forces. The other rebels either were executed or fled.

Demographics
The 2001 Census of India recorded that Antri's population is 12,919. Males constitute 54% of the population, and females 46%. Antri has a literacy rate of 70%, higher than the national average of 59.5%; male literacy is 76%, and female literacy is 63%. In the village, 13% of the population is under six years of age. Hindi is the main language spoken in Antri. Due to rule by the Maratha caste, Marathi influence is strong.

Geography
Antri's coordinates are 26°13'N 78°11'E / 26.22°N 78.18°E / 26.22; 78.18.

A small river, the Chachundar, flows underground and can be seen during the rainy season.

Geology
Antri is situated on Bundelkhand granites formed during the Archean period. Clay deposits are found in the village, referred to as the "Antri deposits of Gwalior" in geological studies.

Climate
Antri has a sub-tropical climate with hot summers from late March to early July, a humid monsoon season from late June to early October and a cool, dry winter from early November to late February. Under the Köppen climate classification, the city has a humid subtropical climate. Summers start in late March. Similarly to other cities like Nagpur and Delhi, they are among the hottest in India and the world. Antri receives  of rain every year, most of which is concentrated in the monsoon months from late June to early October. Winter in Antri starts in late October. In winter, temperatures plummet to near freezing in occasional cold snaps.

Government

The village has a small city council (nagar parishad). Antri's administrative divisions are the 15 wards.

Festivals 
The locals of Antri celebrate all Indian national festivals: Diwali, Holi, Makar Sankranti, Eid-ul-Fitr, Rakhi and Mahavir Jayanti. Several local festivals are also celebrated, such as Nag Panchami, Gudi Padwa, Navratri, Kullu Dussehra, Durga Puja and Ratha-Yatra. In the 21st century, the celebration of Western holidays like Valentine's Day and New Year's Eve has become popular. 

Antri celebrates Rang Panchami differently from other sub-cultures. It is celebrated five days after Dulendi or Holi. Rang Pachami is like Dulendi, but colors are mixed with water, and sprinkled or poured on others. 

In Ganesh Chaturthi, a carnival of floats (Hindi: Jhanki) is held in the village.

Makar Sankranti (the Kite Festival) is celebrated annually on 14 January. People fly kites, competing to cut others' kites white they fly them.

Media and communication 
Newspapers, magazines and television material is published in Gwalior and distributed to Antri. Dainik Bhaskar is one of the oldest and most widely read newspapers.

References

Villages in Gwalior district